Dicuspiditermes incola, is a species of small termite of the genus Dicuspiditermes. It is found in Sri Lanka and India.

References

External links
Diversity and Abundance of Termites in a Mahogany Plantation in the Gannoruwa Hills

Termites
Insects described in 1893